Donnovan Malik Blocker,  known by his stage name Dyme-A-Duzin, is an American rapper, singer, songwriter, and actor from Brooklyn, New York. Dyme-A-Duzin is a former member of the band Phony Ppl. From 2008 to 2013, they performed with popular acts such as Erykah Badu, The Roots and Talib Kweli. His song "New Brooklyn" was listed on Spin's 50 Best Rap Songs of 2013
Dyme made his debut with Warner Bros. Records which caught the eyes of not only the industry but fans around the world. Among the many artists and producers Dyme has worked with Fabolous, Joey Bada$$ and Plain Pat.

Life and career

Early life and musical beginnings
Dyme-A-Duzin was born on May 13, 1992 and grew up in the Crown Heights neighborhood of Brooklyn, New York. Dyme showed an early interest in music, writing his first song at the age of 11 and producing his first music video at the age of 14. He grew up listening to artists such as 50 Cent, Eminem, Kanye West and Jay-Z. Between 2008 and 2011, he released his first three mixtapes via DatPiff, the latter of the three being hosted by Plain Pat. Since their initial release, the mixtapes have gone on to receive over 60,000 views.

2012–2013: Phony Ppl, Warner Bros. Records & A Portrait Of Donnovan
On January 17, 2012, Phony Ppl released their debut album titled Phonyland which was critically acclaimed. The album's sound is characterized as having an eclectic sound that borrows from jazz, hip-hop, R&B, funk, soul and rock. In September 2012, Dyme-A-Duzin signed a recording deal with Warner Bros. Records. In January 2013, Dyme-A-Duzin released his fourth mixtape titled A Portrait of Donnovan. The mixtape featured collaborations with Joey Badass, Capital STEEZ, CJ Fly, Plain Pat, Harry Fraud, Sheriff P and Elbee Thrie. In April 2013, Dyme-A-Duzin, became the East Coast Brand Ambassador for the sneaker and apparel brand Puma; his endorsement was renewed in April 2014. In April 2013, Dyme-A-Duzin performed a 10-country European Tour.

2014–2015: Hip Hope, Independence, That Chicken
In April 2014, Dyme-A-Duzin was feature in Puma’s ‘The Shoestring Xperience’ along with international pop group/producers We Are Twin. In September 2014 Dyme-A-Duzin released his fifth mixtape titled Hip Hope. The mixtape featured collaborations with Casey Veggies, Raz Fresco, Kehlani and more. Dyme-A-Duzin signed to Atlantic Records in 2014.
In 2015 Dyme parted ways with Atlantic. Regaining his independence he released one of his top streamed singles to date "That Chicken". The song/video received praise from many fans & media outlets. Premiering on The Fader in September and airing on BET JAMS shortly after. The song served as the first single to his debut album "Crown Fried"

2016 - 2018: That Chicken (Remix) Ghetto Olympics, Crown Fried
In 2016, during the success of the newly released single "That Chicken" Dyme began the "2 Piece Tuesday" series. Releasing 2 songs every 2 weeks via SoundCloud in anticipation of his "Crown Fried" album from Feb-July. The collection of songs ultimately ended up becoming a mixtape of fan favorites called "2 Piece Tape". That summer, Dyme's music was brought to the attention of veteran rapper Fabolous. The two Brooklyn natives collaborated for a remix version "That Chicken". "That Chicken" (Remix) quickly gained blog and media traction from outlets such as Rap Radar, XXL & Complex. The record also played frequently on late night radio NY radio shows for Hot 97 & Power 105.1. The music video was recorded in Dyme's hometown of Crown Heights and premiered on WorldStarHipHop. It received over 1 million views its first week. On July 14, 2016, Fabolous invited Dyme out to perform alongside him during his headlining set at the Brooklyn Hip-Hop Festival.

Discography

Extended plays
Nothing Special (with Phony Ppl) (2012)
Ghetto Olympics (2017)

Albums
Crown Fried (2018)
GO2 (TBH)

Mixtapes
Shut Up 'n' Listen (2008)
The Orientation (2010)
20=X (2011)
Phonyland (with Phony Ppl) (2012)
A Portrait of Donnovan (2013)
Hip Hope (2014)
2 Piece Tape (2016)

Guest appearances

References

External links
 SPIN's 50 Best Rap Songs of 2013
 Backseat Idol
 The Break Presents: Dyme-A-Duzin
 Brooklyn Rapper DyMe-A-DuZin Wonders: Would Biggie Be Making Trap Rap?

1992 births
African-American male rappers
Living people
Rappers from Brooklyn
21st-century American rappers
21st-century American male musicians
People from Crown Heights, Brooklyn
21st-century African-American musicians